Johnny-head-in-air may refer to:

 Hans Guck-in-die-Luft, a character in Struwwelpeter
 For Johnny, a 1941 war poem by John Pudney